Sergio Souto Vidal (born Oviedo, 4 November 1976) is a Spanish rugby union player. He plays as a lock. His twin brother Carlos Souto was also a Spanish international.

Career
His first international match was on August 24 1999 against Fiji, at Avezzano. He was part of the 1999 Rugby World Cup roster and played in the match against Uruguay, at Galashiels. His last international match was against Romania, at Bucharest, on March 19 2011.

External links
Sergio Souto International Statistics

1976 births
Living people
Sportspeople from Oviedo
Spanish rugby union players
Rugby union locks
Spain international rugby union players
Twin sportspeople